LiP: Informed Revolt was an American alternative magazine that took on various incarnations after its founding in 1996 by former Britannica.com Books (and later, Technology) editor Brian Awehali. It began in Chicago as a zine, distributed mostly at local bookstores and coffee shops, then began publishing online in 2001 before eventually evolving into a full-format North American periodical in 2003. It was run by an all-volunteer staff until 2007, and was devoted to politics, culture, sex and humor, and took a satirical, analytical, and often biting approach to what it called "a culture machine that strips us of our desires and sells them back as product and mass mediocracy."

LiP: Informed Revolt ceased publication in 2007. An anthology of the magazine's best collected works, Tipping the Sacred Cow: The Best of LiP: Informed Revolt was published by AK Press in 2008.

References

External links
 ZNET author Q&A: Roxanne Dunbar-Ortiz interviews Brian Awehali about the publication of Tipping the Sacred Cow - The Best of LiP: Informed Revolt
 Utne - "Shelf Life," article about the demise of Clamor and LiP magazine
 LOUDCANARY - blog of LiP founder and editor Brian Awehali, containing full contents of the extended online release of Tipping the Sacred Cow - The Best of LiP: Informed Revolt (anthology)

Online magazines published in the United States
Defunct political magazines published in the United States
Magazines established in 1996
Magazines disestablished in 2007
Magazines published in the San Francisco Bay Area